The Zimbabwe women's national cricket team represents Zimbabwe in international women's cricket. The team is organised by Zimbabwe Cricket, a full member of the International Cricket Council (ICC).

Zimbabwe made its international debut in 2006, at the ICC Africa regional qualifier for the Women's Cricket World Cup. By winning that tournament, the team qualified for the 2008 World Cup Qualifier, eventually placing fifth out of eight teams by defeating Scotland in a play-off. However, at the 2011 World Cup Qualifier, Zimbabwe had much less success, failing to win a single match. At the 2013 World Twenty20 Qualifier the team placed sixth out of eight teams, while at the 2015 edition the team placed third, narrowly missing out on qualifying for the 2016 World Twenty20.

In December 2018, Mary-Anne Musonda was appointed the captain of the team, replacing Chipo Mugeri.

In December 2020, the ICC announced the qualification pathway for the 2023 ICC Women's T20 World Cup. Zimbabwe were named in the 2021 ICC Women's T20 World Cup Africa Qualifier regional group, alongside ten other teams.

In April 2021, the ICC awarded permanent Test and One Day International (ODI) status to all full member women's teams.

Current squad

This lists all the players who have played for Zimbabwe in the past 12 months or was named in the most recent One-day or T20I squad. Updated on 26 April 2022.

Coaching staff

 Head coach:  Gary Brent

 Assistant coach:  Sinikiwe Mpofu
 Bowling Coach:  Trevor Garwe
 Fielding Coach:  Trevor Phiri 
 Physiotherapist: Farai Mabasa
 Trainer:  Clement Rizhibowa

Records and statistics
International Match Summary — Zimbabwe Women
 
Last updated 23 September 2022

One-Day Internationals
ODI record versus other nations

Records complete to WODI #1231. Last updated 27 November 2021.

Twenty20 Internationals

 Highest team total: 205/3, v. Mozambique on 13 September 2021 at Botswana Cricket Association Oval 1, Gaborone.
 Highest individual score: 80, Chipo Mugeri-Tiripano v. Namibia on 20 April 2022, at Trans Namib Ground, Windhoek.
 Best individual bowling figures: 6/11, Esther Mbofana v. Eswatini on 11 September 2021 at Botswana Cricket Association Oval 1, Gaborone.

Most T20I runs for Zimbabwe Women

Most T20I wickets for Zimbabwe Women

T20I record versus other nations

Records complete to T20I #1230. Last updated 23 September 2022.

See also
 Zimbabwe national cricket team
 List of Zimbabwe women Twenty20 International cricketers

References

Cricket in Zimbabwe
Zimbabwe women's national cricket team
Women's national cricket teams
Women
Cricket